Tropicana Nights is a studio album released by the Cuban jazz performer Paquito D'Rivera on November 11, 2008. The album earned D'Rivera the Latin Grammy Award for Best Latin Jazz Album in 2000.

Track listing
The track listing from Allmusic.

References

1999 albums
Chesky Records albums
Paquito D'Rivera albums
Latin Grammy Award for Best Latin Jazz Album